Kajsa Rinaldo Persson (born 11 November 1997) is a Swedish tennis player.

Rinaldo Persson has a career-high singles ranking of 524 by the Women's Tennis Association (WTA), achieved on 21 December 2015, and a career-high WTA doubles ranking of 648, reached on 14 December 2015. She has won one ITF singles title and three ITF doubles titles.

Rinaldo Persson has represented Sweden in the Fed Cup, where she has a win–loss record of 1–1.

ITF finals

Singles: 4 (3 titles, 1 runner–up)

Doubles: 8 (3 titles, 5 runner–ups)

Fed Cup/Billie Jean King Cup participation

Doubles

External links
 
 
 
 

1997 births
Living people
Swedish female tennis players
20th-century Swedish women
21st-century Swedish women